Alice Superiore (Piedmontese: Àles) is a frazione of the  comune of Val di Chy in the Metropolitan City of Turin in the Italian region Piedmont, located about  north of Turin. It was an independent comune until 2019.

Val di Chy